Mehmed Şükrü Pasha (1857 –  5 June 1916) was a general (Birindji ferik) in the Ottoman Army.

Biography 
He was the only child of Kolağası (Senior Captain) Mustafa and Muhsine from the TurkishAyabakan family, and was born in Erzurum in 1857.
He started his education in Erzincan Military High School with great interest in military service when he was a child, but after his father's death, his mother remarried, he got offended, moved away from his environment, entered the Sütlüce Artillery School in Istanbul, and graduated from the War College in 1879 as an Artillery Lieutenant. He defended the city of Edirne, which was besieged by the Bulgarians during the Balkan Wars, under difficult conditions for 155 days. There is a monument in Edirne built in his name.

He died on 5 June 1916 at his home in Istanbul. He was buried in Merkezefendi Cemetery.

References

1856 births
1916 deaths
People from Erzurum
Ottoman Army generals
Turks from the Ottoman Empire
Military personnel of the Ottoman Empire
Ottoman military personnel of the Balkan Wars
19th-century Ottoman military personnel